Francis George Wall was a Mormon Pioneer.

People from Sevier County, Utah